Joseph C V Heath was a male athlete who competed for England.

Athletics career
He competed for England in the javelin at the 1934 British Empire Games in London.

Heath represented Birchfield Harriers  and was the 1932 AAA champion.

References

English male javelin throwers
Athletes (track and field) at the 1934 British Empire Games
Commonwealth Games competitors for England